Thulium(II) fluoride is one of the fluoride salts of the lanthanide metal thulium, with the chemical compound of TmF2. It can react with zirconium tetrafluoride at 900 °C to form TmZrF6, which has a hexagonal structure.
In addition, low-temperature Mössbauer spectroscopy and some theoretical studies of thulium(II) fluoride have also been reported.

References 

Thulium compounds
Fluorides